Meghan Wren (September 19, 1984 – April 2, 2016), known professionally as Amber Rayne, was an American pornographic actress.

Biography 
Rayne was born in Detroit and raised in Northern California. She was of mixed Italian, Scottish, Irish and Native American descent. She attended California State University, Los Angeles. She worked as an extra in mainstream films and television shows prior to her adult film career.

Rayne entered the adult film industry in 2005. Early in her porn career she resided in Santa Monica, California. In April 2015 she announced her official retirement from adult films.

She came out of retirement to shoot her final adult film, Wanted, later that year. She had already promised the film's director, Stormy Daniels, that she would be part of the film six years prior to shooting it. Besides performing, she had also worked in the adult-film industry as a fluffer, director, producer, and editor.

Rayne was a BDSM lifestyler both on-screen and in her personal life. She owned rabbits, a mule named Zephyr, and was a driving instructor. She had battled both non-Hodgkin lymphoma and uterine cancer.

Death 
Rayne collapsed and died at her home in Los Angeles, California, on April 2, 2016. In late June 2016, the Los Angeles County Department of Medical Examiner-Coroner's office announced that her death was caused by an accidental drug overdose through the consumption of a combination of cocaine and alcohol.

Awards and nominations

References

External links 

 
 
 

1984 births
2016 deaths
Actresses from California
American pornographic film actresses
Cocaine-related deaths in California
BDSM people
California State University, Los Angeles alumni
Pornographic film actors from California
People from Sun Valley, Los Angeles
Sex workers drug-related deaths
21st-century American women